Catacolpodes is a genus of beetles in the family Carabidae, containing the following species:

 Catacolpodes aeneicollis (Jeannel, 1948)
 Catacolpodes arcticollis (Jeannel, 1951)
 Catacolpodes brachypterus Basilewsky, 1985
 Catacolpodes brevicornis (Jeannel, 1948)
 Catacolpodes carayoni Basilewsky, 1985
 Catacolpodes chalcotinctus Basilewsky, 1985
 Catacolpodes cordicollis Basilewsky, 1985
 Catacolpodes depressus (Jeannel, 1951)
 Catacolpodes divaricatus (Jeannel, 1948)
 Catacolpodes dolius (Alluaud, 1909)
 Catacolpodes eugrammus (Alluaud, 1932)
 Catacolpodes eutinctus Basilewsky, 1985
 Catacolpodes gitonius (Alluaud, 1935)
 Catacolpodes labathiei (Jeannel, 1948)
 Catacolpodes languidus Basilewsky, 1985
 Catacolpodes longespinosus (Basilewsky, 1970)
 Catacolpodes micheli (Jeannel, 1951)
 Catacolpodes mocquerysi (Jeannel, 1948)
 Catacolpodes nanus Basilewsky, 1985
 Catacolpodes petrorum Basilewsky, 1985
 Catacolpodes renaudi Basilewsky, 1985
 Catacolpodes rhagodus (Basilewsky, 1970)
 Catacolpodes scitoides Basilewsky, 1985
 Catacolpodes scitus (Jeannel, 1948)
 Catacolpodes scrobiculatus Basilewsky, 1985
 Catacolpodes sicardi (Alluaud, 1909)
 Catacolpodes silvicola (Jeannel, 1951)
 Catacolpodes sinopis (Alluaud, 1935)
 Catacolpodes solitarius Basilewsky, 1985
 Catacolpodes variolosus (Alluaud, 1897)

References

Platyninae